Rugbyclub Curtrycke is a Belgian rugby club in the submunicipality of Rollegem in the city of Kortrijk.

History
The club was founded in 2000.

External links
Rugbyclub Curtrycke

Belgian rugby union clubs
Rugby clubs established in 2000